Carvajal (also spelled Carbajal) is a surname and place name of Spanish origin. Notable people with the surname include:

 Alfonso Carvajal (writer) (born 1958), Colombian writer and editor
 Andarín Carvajal (1875–1949), Cuban athlete
 Antonio Fernandez Carvajal (c.1590–1659), Portuguese Jewish merchant, and the first naturalized English Jew
 Beatriz Carvajal (born 1949), Spanish actress
 Bernardino López de Carvajal (1455–1523), Spanish cardinal
 Dani Carvajal (born 1992), Spanish footballer
 Francisco de Carvajal (1464–1548), Spanish military officer, conquistador, and explorer
 Francisco Fernández Carvajal (born 1938), priest in the Opus Dei Prelature and author of several books
 Francisco S. Carvajal (1870–1932), Mexican president in 1914
 Gaspar de Carvajal (c.1500–1584), Spanish Dominican missionary to the New World
 Iván Carvajal (born 1948), Ecuadorian poet, philosopher and writer
 José de Carvajal y Hué (1835–1899), Spanish lawyer, economist and politician
 José de Carvajal y Lancáster (1698–1754), Spanish statesman
 Juan Carvajal (cardinal) (1400–1469), Spanish cardinal
 Juan de Carvajal, Spanish conquistador, founder of El Tocuyo in 1545
 Luisa Carvajal y Mendoza (1566–1614), Spanish religious poet and writer
 Luis de Carvajal y de la Cueva (c. 1539–1595), Spanish-Portuguese adventurer, slave-trader and governor
  (c. 1566-1596), nephew of the above, changed his name to José Lumbroso and was burned at the stake by the Spanish Inquicition in Mexico City for Judaizing
 Maria Lourdes Jimenez Carvajal (1944–2003), popularly known as Inday Badiday, a Filipino TV host and journalist
 Marcos Carvajal (1984–2018), baseball player
 Máximo Carvajal (1935–2006), Chilean comic book artist
 Melitón Carvajal (1847–1935), Peruvian naval officer
 Patricio Carvajal (1916–1994), Chilean admiral
 Rafael Carvajal (1818–1881), President of Ecuador in 1865
 Tomás José González-Carvajal (1753–1834), Spanish poet and statesman

See also
 BAP Carvajal (FM-51), Peruvian frigate
 Carvajal Ministry, a Spanish government which served between 1746 and 1754 headed by José de Carvajal y Lancáster
 Carvajal syndrome, a type of skin condition
 Edmundo Carvajal Airport in Ecuador

 Carabajal (disambiguation)

Spanish-language surnames